
Year 127 BC was a year of the pre-Julian Roman calendar. At the time it was known as the Year of the Consulship of Ravilla and Cinna (or, less frequently, year 627 Ab urbe condita) and the Second Year of Yuanshuo. The denomination 127 BC for this year has been used since the early medieval period, when the Anno Domini calendar era became the prevalent method in Europe for naming years.

Events 
 By place 
 Parthia 
 The Scythians defeat the Parthians in a battle around Media.

 China 
 January: Emperor Wu of Han begins a policy of pressuring the client kings of the Han Dynasty into dividing their kingdoms. Previously, only the eldest son would inherit a kingdom. However, in an edict, Wu permits the kings of Liang and Chengyang to divide the land of their states and distribute the land to their younger brothers. Wu grants these brothers titles and promises to do the same if other kings grant land to younger brothers and younger sons. This precedent pressures other kings to do likewise, and Wu places the younger brothers and younger sons under the jurisdiction of the imperial prefectures.
 Wei Qing defeats a Xiongnu army near Gaoque. He then invades the Ordos Plateau, defeats the Xiongnu and their Baiyang and Loufan allies in the battles of Puni and Fuli, and then defeats the main Xiongnu force. The conquered territory becomes Shuofang Commandery. Wu orders the foundation of Shuofang City, and the system of defenses that had been built by the Qin Dynasty general Meng Tian are repaired.
 The Han rationalize the northern frontier, abandoning the remote region of Zaoyang to the Xiongnu.

Births

Deaths 
 Nicomedes II (Epiphanes), king of Bithynia
 Zhufu Yan, Chinese politician and official of the Han Dynasty (or 126 BC)

References